Koninklijke Beerschot Voetbalclub Antwerpen, or simply Beerschot, is a Belgian professional football club located in Antwerp, that competes in the second-tier First Division B after relegating from the top tier in the 2021–22 season. In 2013, KFCO Wilrijk decided to integrate the identity of Beerschot AC when they were relegated in the 2012–13 season, not only through their league position but also due to losing their professional licence through financial issues, being officially declared bankrupt on 21 May 2013 and folding shortly afterwards. The club colours are purple and white, they play their games on the club's home ground the Olympic Stadium often referred to as 't Kiel.

History

KFCO Wilrijk
The club was founded in 1921 as Football Club Wilrijk and joined The Belgian football association.

As a result of the introduction of a national third division in 1926, the club played national football for the first time in their then short existence. Unfortunately the club ended third last, leading to their relegation after just one season. In 1931 the number of participants in the divisions was increased, causing FC Wilrijk to be included on the national level for the second time. FC Wilrijk lasted two seasons before being relegated again.

In 1935 the club was promoted once more. Unlike their previous third division stays, FC Wilrijk showcased dominant football. This resulted in a 3rd position in the 1935–36 season and even becoming third division champions in the 1936–37 season. After winning their division the club was promoted to the second division lasting two seasons before being relegated in 1939. After a lengthy stay in the third division, FC Wilrijk was relegated to the Provincial division in 1949 which set a trend for the following decades.

In 1993 KFC Wilrijk merged with Olympia Wilrijk 72. This other Wilrijk-based club, was founded in 1972 and part of the Royal Belgian Football Association, being assigned the association number 7727. Both clubs shared forces as KFC Olympia Wilrijk and continued under KFC Wilrijks association number 155.

In 1994, the club reached the 4th division, playing national football for the first time in 45 years. In the 1995–96 season KFCO Olympia Wilrijk came in 3rd only two points short of standing victorious in their division. After eight years KFC Olympia Wilrijk ended third last, which led to being relegated. Their absence was short-lived however, as KFC Olympia Wilrijk was promoted the following year resulting in a three-year stay before being relegated. In 2008 the club was promoted again, only to be relegated in 2010.

FCO Beerschot Wilrijk
After Beerschot AC's bankruptcy in 2013, KFCO Wilrijk decided to harbour its fans. KFCO Wilrijk followed up by incorporating the name Beerschot and their respective colours in their own identity. The KBVB however decided that due to the name change, the club was no longer eligible to use the handle "royal" in their club name. Hence the club's name is FCO Beerschot Wilrijk rather than KFCO Beerschot Wilrijk. In order to retrieve their "royal" status, FCO Beerschot Wilrijk filed a successful application in June 2017.

FCO Beerschot Wilrijk, became an instant success. Their season opener against Ternesse VV was attended by 8500 fans, which was a record for the Belgian provincial division at the time. This record was broken on 15 February 2014 during their game against fierce title contender FC De Kempen which was attended by 8982 fans and topped again, during their title game against KFC Katelijne-Waver on 22 March. This game was attended by almost 12000 fans and won by 5–0, gaining the club mathematic certainty about crowning themselves 2013–14 division champions.

Due to the club's high attendance – weekly attendance that tops several first division teams – KFCO Beerschot Wilrijk is required to play their home games at the Olympisch Stadion (city of Antwerp) to guarantee the safety of their fans. This is the home ground of the fallen Beerschot VAC. The club reached an average of 7000 fans at home games during its first season in the 1st division of the province of Antwerp, which is quite a feat. This reputation was upheld during away games by bringing on average over 1500 fans, whom took pride in causing friendly banter in the most obscurely hidden cities and stadiums that the province of Antwerp holds. The club's success and vibe often lead to opponents renting bigger stadiums because the prospected attendance exceeds their own stadium capacity.

For the 2014–15 season, FCO Beerschot Wilrijk was promoted to the 4th division in Belgian national football. In mid-March 2015, they held a 10-point lead over their closest rival. They were promoted to third division as champions of their group. In 2015–2016 they became champions of the third division after a sensational winning goal in the last minute of their last game. In 2016–2017 they became the first champion of the new '1st Amateur League' and gained promotion to the Proximus League, the second tier of Belgian football.

In February 2018, Saudi prince Abdullah bin Musa'ad bin Abdulaziz Al Saud, owner of the English Premier League side Sheffield United, announced his investment in Beerschot alongside Belgian construction company DCA.

Beerschot
In 2019, the club changed its name to Beerschot, and also changed the club logo.

They played in the Proximus League for three seasons, and played the promotion final each year. Finally, after losing to Cercle Brugge K.S.V.  and K.V. Mechelen , they gained promotion to the Belgian Belgian First Division A at the end of the 2019-2020 season.

Results

As a result, KFCO BW remained in the third division.

Current squad

Out on loan

Club Staff

Managers

Club captains

Top scorers

Affiliated clubs
The following clubs are currently affiliated with:

 Sheffield United FC (2020–present)
 Kerala United FC (2020–present)
 Al-Hilal United (2020–present)
 LB Châteauroux (2020–present)

References

 
2013 establishments in Belgium
Association football clubs established in 2013
Football clubs in Antwerp
Belgian Pro League clubs